David Justin Hanson (born 1941) is Professor Emeritus of Sociology at the State University of New York in Potsdam, New York. He has researched the subject of alcohol and drinking for over 30 years, beginning with his PhD dissertation investigation, and has written widely on the subject.

Professor Hanson investigates the effects of moderate alcohol consumption on health. He has amassed a large, robust body of evidence that shows the benefits of moderate drinking. Hanson is a critic of many groups that advocate the reduction of alcohol use as the solution to alcohol problems in society; he describes these groups as “neo-prohibitionist.” 

Hanson criticizes what he calls the "temperance mentality" of many groups and claims that "their tactic is to establish cultural rather than strictly legal prohibition by making alcohol beverages less socially acceptable and marginalizing those who drink, no matter how moderately."

A critic of the 21-year age limit on legal drinking in the United States, he supports the acceptance of drinking learner permits for adults under the age of 21, analogous to driving learner permits.

Hanson has published books and over 300 other publications on alcohol and maintains three websites on the subject, none of which receives any support from the alcohol industry. His research and opinions have been reported in the New York Times and other newspapers; he has been quoted in Family Circle, Health magazine, Parade and other popular publications; and textbooks in 15 fields of study report his research.

Select publications
Congressional Temperance Society. In: Martin, S.C., et al. Alcohol: Social, Cultural, and Historical Perspectives. Thousand Oaks, CA: Sage Reference Books, 2015.
Binge Drinking. In: Hanson, G.R., et al. Drugs & Society. Sudbury, MA: Jones & Bartlett, 13th ed., 2014.
Historical Evolution of Alcohol Consumption in Society. In: Boyle, P., et al. (eds.) Alcohol: Science, Policy and Public Health. Oxford, England: Oxford University Press, 2013
Education on Drinking Responsibly Must Replace Neo-Prohibitionism. In: Kesbye, S. (ed.) Should the Legal Drinking Age be Lowered? Detroit, MI: Greenhaven Press, 2013.
The Effects of Substances on Driving. In: Miller, P. (ed). Principles of Addiction, Vol. 1. Amsterdam, the Netherlands: Elsevier Academic Press, 2012.
Living with Drugs. In: Wilson, H.T. (ed). Drugs, Society, and Behavior. Boston, MA: McGraw-Hill Higher Education, 27th ed., 2012.
Alcoholics Anonymous (AA). In: Barnett, G. (ed). Encyclopedia of Social Networks. London, England: Sage, 2011.
Responses to Arguments Against the Minimum Drinking Age. In: Channell, C. and Crusius, A. (eds). Engaging Questions: A Guide to Writing. NY: McGraw-Hill, 2011.
Thinking Like a Researcher. In: Korgen, K., et al. (eds.) Sociologists in Action, Social Change, and Social Justice. Los Angeles, CA: Sage, 2011.
History of Alcohol and Drinking around the World. In: Wilson, H. (ed). Drugs, Society and Behavior, 25th ed. NY: McGraw-Hill, 2010.
The Extent of Teen Drinking is Exaggerated. In: Roleff, T. (ed). Alcoholism. Detroit, MI: Greenhaven Press, 2010.
Alcohol Advertising. In: Esposito, R. (ed). Mass Media. Detroit, MI: Greenhaven Press, 2010.
DWI Courts: Effectively Addressing Drunk Driving. In: Higgins, P. and MacKinem, M. (eds). Problem-Solving Courts: Justice for the Twenty-First Century. Westport, CT: Praeger Publishers, 2009.
Repeal of Prohibition in the U.S. In: Engdahl, S. (ed). Constitutional Amendments: Amendments XVIII and XXI  -  Prohibition and Repeal. Farmington Hills, MI: Gale Publishing, 2009.

References

External links

Hanson's webpages
 Alcohol: Problems and Solutions
  Alcohol Facts
 Find Alcoholism Help

Other
 Mangled Drunk Driving Data? - Dr. David J. Hanson interview
 Fox News: Lawsuits, Alcohol Advertising and Money
 Los Angeles Times: Alcohol figures into some young Americans' European plans (may require registration)
 About David J. Hanson

American sociologists
Researchers in alcohol abuse
1941 births
Living people
Youth rights people